Anna Freeman (born 1954) is a trumpet player and  Professor of Trumpet and Brass Chamber Music at Hochschule für Musik und Tanz Köln in Germany. She was a soloist with Australian symphony orchestras and performed with the Australian Chamber Orchestra.

Early life 
Freeman was born in 1954 in Drouin, Victoria, Australia, and studied at Victorian College of the Arts (now part of the University of Melbourne), earning a Diploma of Performing Arts in 1976. She became a lecturer at Canberra Institute of the Arts (now part of Australian National University) and the Victorian College of the Arts. She travelled to Europe (Schola Cantorum Basiliensis in Switzerland) and was Guest Principal Trumpet with the Zurich Chamber Orchestra.

In 1999, she became Professor of Trumpet and Head of Brass at the Hochschule für Musik und Tanz Köln in Aachen, Germany. She has also taught at Switzerland's Musikhochschule Winterthur in Zurich. She released CDs and published her trumpet method in a book called Beyond Brass Basics, A Guide to Common Sense Brass Playing (Spaeth/Schmid Verlag).  She performs concerts and recitals and records around the world including Europe, USA, New Zealand, Japan, and Australia.

Discography

"Baroque Trumpet and Strings"

Supported by Australian baroque string and keyboard players, Freeman's CD covers repertoire from a diverse group of eight composers. Performers include the following:

 Linda Kent - organ
 Anna Freeman - baroque trumpet
 Julie Hewison - first violin
 Lucinda Moon - second violin
 Miriam Morris - cello
 Jenny Ingram - viola

References

External links

Living people
Australian trumpeters
Musicians from Victoria (Australia)
1954 births
Australian women musicians
Academic staff of the Hochschule für Musik und Tanz Köln
University of Melbourne alumni
Academic staff of the University of Melbourne
Academic staff of the Australian National University
21st-century trumpeters
21st-century women musicians
Women music educators
Women trumpeters